The DC101 Chili Cook-Off is an annual rock concert sponsored by Washington, D.C. / Baltimore, Maryland radio station WWDC (FM).  Proceeds from the concert, traditionally held in Washington, D.C. in mid-to-late May, are donated to the National Capital Area chapter of the National Kidney Foundation. The name originates from the chili competition that used to occur during the event. Unlike what the name implies, some recent events did not actually offer any chili, though in 2013 chili was offered in three different booths.

The main features of the event are a rock music concert, although vendors and sponsors also set up booths to form a temporary marketplace.

In its earlier years, the Cook-Off was often held at the intersection of K St. and Wisconsin Ave. in the Georgetown neighborhood of Washington, D.C., but later moved to the intersection of 12th St. and Pennsylvania Ave.  After 9/11, security concerns forced the event to move to a series of nearby locations over the next several years.  Recently, the Cook-Off has been held at the Center City Lot, formerly the location of the Washington Convention Center.  In 2009, for the first time, the Cook-Off was held at RFK Stadium.

The 2009 Chili Cook-Off attracted the largest crowd in the event's history, with 35,000 attendees.

Music

The concert portion showcases the music of several modern rock acts, all performing on a single stage erected in the RFK stadium parking lot. Lineups for the concert are usually announced in late March or early April.  In recent years, a "Last Band Standing" competition has been held to select a local group to open the show.

Some bands have performed at the festival during more than one year, including Downtown, Bird Dog Wheeler, Child's Play, emmet swimming, Seven Mary Three, Sponge, Jimmie's Chicken Shack, Finger Eleven, Puddle of Mudd, Carbon Leaf, Third Eye Blind, Rude Buddha, Switchfoot, Chevelle, Papa Roach, Cake, and Seether.

DC101 announced the Kerfuffle for 2014 at Merriweather Post Pavilion, but there was no mention of a 2014 Chili Cook-Off.  The date of the DC101 Kerfuffle is May 3, around the time the Cook-Off is usually held.

History

References

Rock festivals in the United States
Cooking competitions in the United States
Chili con carne festivals